The Ghana Statistical Service (GSS) is a Ghanaian governing body established to report to the presidency. The GSS conducts Population and Housing Census in the country.

History 
The GSS is a Public Service body established under the Statistical Service Law 135 in 1985 by the PNDC. The first population census in Ghana began in 1891 as efforts were made to collect and disseminate statistical information.

References 

National statistical services
Government agencies of Ghana